Palestine participated in the 2007 Asian Winter Games held in Changchun, China from 28 January 2007 to 4 February 2007.

References

Nations at the 2007 Asian Winter Games
Sport in the State of Palestine
Asian Winter Games
Palestine at the Asian Winter Games